The Javanese script (natively known as Aksara Jawa, Hanacaraka, Carakan, and Dentawyanjana) is one of Indonesia's traditional scripts developed on the island of Java. The script is primarily used to write the Javanese language, but in the course of its development has also been used to write several other regional languages such as Sundanese, Madurese, and Sasak; the lingua franca of the region, Malay; as well as the historical languages Kawi and Sanskrit. Javanese script was actively used by the Javanese people for writing day-to-day and literary texts from at least the mid-15th century CE until the mid-20th century CE, before its function was gradually supplanted by the Latin alphabet. Today the script is taught in DI Yogyakarta, Central Java, and the East Java Province as part of the local curriculum, but with very limited function in everyday use.

The Javanese script is an abugida writing system which consists of 20 to 33 basic letters, depending on the language being written. Like other Brahmic scripts, each letter (called an aksara) represents a syllable with the inherent vowel /a/ or /ɔ/ which can be changed with the placement of diacritics around the letter. Each letter has a conjunct form called pasangan, which nullifies the inherent vowel of the previous letter. Traditionally, the script is written without space between words (scriptio continua) but is interspersed with a group of decorative punctuation.

History
Javanese script is one of the Brahmi descendants in Indonesia in which its evolutionary history can be traced fairly well due to the numerous inscriptional evidences that permitted epigraphical studies. The oldest root of the Javanese script is Indian Brahmi script which evolves into Pallava script in Southern India and Southeast Asia between the 6th and 8th centuries. Pallava script, in turn, evolved into Kawi script which was actively used throughout Indonesia's Hindu-Buddhist period between the 8th and 15th centuries. In various parts of Indonesia, Kawi script would evolve into one of Indonesia's traditional scripts, among them, Javanese script. Modern Javanese script evolved over time from the late Kawi script between the 14th and 15th centuries, a period in which Java began to receive significant Islamic influence.

For at least 500 years, from the 15th until the mid 20th century, Javanese script was actively used by the Javanese people for writing day-to-day and literary texts with a wide range of a theme and content. Javanese script was used throughout the island at a time when there was no easy means of communication between remote areas and no impulse towards standardization. As a result, there is a huge variety in historical and local styles of Javanese writing throughout the ages. The ability of a person to read a bark-paper manuscript from the town of Demak, say, written around 1700, is no guarantee that the same person would also be able to make sense of a palm-leaf manuscript written at the same time only 50 miles away on the slopes of Mount Merapi. The great differences between regional styles almost makes it seem that the "Javanese script" is in fact a family of scripts. Javanese writing traditions are especially cultivated in the Kraton environment, but Javanese texts are known to be made and used by all layers of society. Javanese literature is almost always composed in metrical verses that are designed to be sung, thus Javanese texts are not only judged by their content and language but also by the merit of their melody and rhythm during recitation sessions. Javanese writing tradition also relied on periodic copying due to deterioration of writing materials in the tropical Javanese climate; as a result, many physical manuscripts that are available now are 18th or 19th century copies, though their contents can usually be traced to far older prototypes.

Media

Javanese script has been written with numerous media that have shifted over time. Kawi script, which is ancestral to Javanese script, is often found on stone inscriptions and copper plates. Everyday writing in Kawi was done in palm leaf form locally known as lontar, which are processed leaves of the tal palm (Borassus flabellifer). Each lontar leaf has the shape of a slim rectangle 2.8 to 4 cm in width and varied length between 20 and 80 cm. Each leaf can only accommodate around 4 lines of writing, which are incised in horizontal orientation with a small knife and then blackened with soot to increase readability. This media has a long history of attested use all over South and Southeast Asia.

In the 13th century, paper began to be used in the Malay archipelago. This introduction is related to spread of Islam in the region, due to the Islamic writing tradition that is supported by the use of paper and codex manuscript. As Java began to receive significant Islamic influence in the 15th century, coinciding with the period in which the Kawi script began to transition into the modern Javanese script, paper became widespread in Java while the use of lontar only persisted in a few places. There are two kinds of paper that are commonly used in Javanese manuscript: locally produced paper called daluang, and imported paper. Daluang (also spelled dluwang) is a paper made from the beaten bark of the saéh tree (Broussonetia papyrifera). Visually, daluang can be easily differentiated from regular paper by its distinctive brown tint and fibrous appearance. A well made daluang has a smooth surface and is quite durable against manuscript damage commonly associated with tropical climates, especially insect damage. Meanwhile, a coarse daluang has a bumpy surface and tends to break easily. Daluang is commonly used in manuscripts produced by Javanese Kratons (palaces) and pesantren (Islamic boarding schools) between the 16th to 17th centuries.

Most imported paper in Indonesian manuscripts came from Europe. In the beginning, only a few scribes were able to use European paper due to its high cost—paper made with using European methods of the time could only be imported in limited number. In colonial administration, the use of European paper had to be supplemented with Javanese daluang and imported Chinese paper until at least the 19th century. As paper supply increased due to growing imports from Europe, scribes in palaces and urban settlements gradually opted to use European paper as the primary media for writing, while daluang paper was increasingly associated with pesantren and rural manuscripts. Alongside the increase of European paper supply, attempts to create Javanese printing type began, spearheaded by several European figures. With the establishment of printing technology in 1825, materials in Javanese script could be mass-produced and became increasingly common in various aspect of pre-independence Javanese life, from letters, books, and newspapers, to magazines, and even advertisements and paper currency.

Usage

For at least 500 years, from the 15th century until the mid 20th century, Javanese script was used by all layers of Javanese society for writing day-to-day and literary texts with a wide range of theme and content. Due to the significant influence of oral tradition, reading in pre-independence Javanese society is usually a performance; Javanese literature texts are almost always composed in metrical verses that are designed to be recited, thus Javanese texts are not only judged by their content and language, but also by the merit of their melody and rhythm during recitation sessions. Javanese poets are not expected to create new stories and characters; instead the role of the poet is to rewrite and recompose existing stories into forms that are suitable to local taste and prevailing trends. As a result, Javanese literary works such as the Cerita Panji do not have a single authoritative version referenced by all others, instead, the Cerita Panji is a loose collection of numerous tales with various versions bound together by the common thread of the Panji character. Literature genres with the longest attested history are Sanskrit epics such as the Ramayana and the Mahabharata, which have been recomposed since the Kawi period and which introduced hundreds of characters familiar in Javanese wayang stories today, including Arjuna, Srikandi, Ghatotkacha and many others. Since the introduction of Islam, characters of Middle-Eastern provenance such as Amir Hamzah and the Prophet Joseph have also been frequent subjects of writing. There are also local characters, usually set in Java's semi-legendary past, such as Prince Panji, Damar Wulan, and Calon Arang.

When studies of Javanese language and literature began to attract European attention in the 19th century, an initiative to create a Javanese movable type began to take place in order to mass-produce and quickly disseminate Javanese literary materials. One of the earliest attempts to create a movable Javanese type was by Paul van Vlissingen. His typeface was first put in use in the Bataviasche Courant newspaper's October 1825 issue. While lauded as a considerable technical achievement, many at the time felt that Vlissingen's design was a coarse copy of the fine Javanese hand used in literary texts, and so this early attempt was further developed by numerous other people to varying degrees of success as the study of Javanese developed over the years. In 1838,  completed his typeface, known as Tuladha Jejeg, that was based on the hand of Surakartan scribes with some European typographical elements mixed in. Roorda's font garnered positive feedback and soon became the main choice to print any Javanese text. From then, reading materials in printed Javanese using Roorda's typeface became widespread among the Javanese populace and were widely used in materials other than literature. The establishment of print technology enabled a printing industry which, for the next century, produced various materials in printed Javanese, from administrative papers and school books, to mass media such as the  magazine which was entirely printed in Javanese in all of its article and columns. In the governmental context, one application of the Javanese script was the multilingual legal text on the Netherlands Indies gulden banknotes circulated by the Bank of Java.

Decline
As literacy and demand for reading materials increased in the beginning of the 20th century, Javanese publishers paradoxically began to decrease the amount of Javanese script publication due to a practical and economic consideration: printing any text in Javanese script at the time required twice the amount of paper compared to the same text rendered in the Latin alphabet, so that Javanese texts were more expensive and time-consuming to produce. In order to lower production costs and keep book prices affordable to the general populace, many publishers (such as the government-owned Balai Pustaka) gradually prioritized publication in the Latin alphabet. However, the Javanese population at the beginning of the 20th century maintained the use of Javanese script in various aspects of everyday life. It was, for example, considered more polite to write a letter using Javanese script, especially one addressed toward an elder or superior. Many publishers, including Balai Pustaka, continued to print books, newspapers, and magazines in Javanese script due to sufficient, albeit declining, demand. The use of Javanese script only started to drop significantly during the Japanese occupation of Indonesia beginning in 1942. Some writers attribute this sudden decline to prohibitions issued by the Japanese government banning the use of native script in the public sphere, though no documentary evidence of such a ban has yet been found. Nevertheless, the use of Javanese script did decline significantly during the Japanese occupation and it never recovered its previous widespread use in post-independence Indonesia.

Contemporary use
In contemporary usage, Javanese script is still taught as part of the local curriculum in Yogyakarta, Central Java, and the East Java Province. Several local newspapers and magazines have columns written in Javanese script, and the script can frequently be seen on public signage. However, many contemporary attempts to revive Javanese script are symbolic rather than functional; there are no longer, for example, periodicals like Kajawèn magazine that publish significant content in Javanese script. Most Javanese people today know the existence of the script and recognize a few letters, but it is rare to find someone who can read and write it meaningfully. Therefore, as recently as 2019, it is not uncommon to see Javanese script signage in public places with numerous misspellings and basic mistakes. Several hurdles in revitalizing the use of Javanese script includes information technology equipment that does not support correct rendering of the Javanese script, lack of governing bodies with sufficient competence to consult on its usage, and lack of typographical explorations that may intrigue contemporary viewers. Nevertheless, attempts to revive the script are still being conducted by several communities and public figures who encouraged the use of Javanese script in the public sphere, especially with digital devices.

Form

Letter 
A basic letter in the Javanese script is called an aksara which represents a syllable. Javanese script contains around 45 letters, but not all of them are used equally. Over the course of its development, some letters became obsolete and some are only used in certain contexts. As such, it is common to divide the letters in several groups based on their function.

Wyanjana 
The Aksara wyanjana (ꦲꦏ꧀ꦱꦫ ꦮꦾꦚ꧀ꦗꦤ) are consonant letters with an inherent vowel, either /a/ or /ɔ/. As a Brahmi derived script, the Javanese script originally had 33 wyanjana letters to write the 33 consonants that are used in Sanskrit and Kawi. Their forms are as follows:

Over the course of its development, the modern Javanese language no longer uses all letters in the Sanskrit-Kawi inventory. The modern Javanese script only uses 20 consonants and 20 basic letters known as aksara nglegéna (ꦲꦏ꧀ꦱꦫ ꦔ꧀ꦭꦼꦒꦺꦤ). Some of the remaining letters are repurposed as aksara murda (ꦲꦏ꧀ꦱꦫ ꦩꦸꦂꦢ) which are used for honorific purposes in writing respected names, be it legendary (for example Bima ꦨꦶꦩ) or real (for example Pakubuwana ꦦꦑꦸꦨꦸꦮꦟ). From the 20 nglegéna basic letters, only 9 have corresponding murda forms. Because of this, the use of murda is not identical to capitalization of proper names in Latin orthography; if the first syllable of a name does not have a murda form, the second syllable would use murda. If the second syllable also does not have a murda form, the third syllable would use murda, and so on. Highly respected names may be written completely in murda if possible, but in essence, the use of murda is optional and may be inconsistent in traditional texts. For example, the name Gani can be spelled as ꦒꦤꦶ (without murda), ꦓꦤꦶ (with murda on the first syllable), or ꦓꦟꦶ (with murda on all syllables) depending on the background and context of the writing. The remaining letters that are not classified as nglegéna or repurposed as murda are aksara mahaprana, letters that are used in Sanskrit and Kawi texts but obsolete in modern Javanese.

Swara 
Aksara swara (ꦲꦏ꧀ꦱꦫ ꦱ꧀ꦮꦫ) are letters that represent pure vowels. Javanese script has 14 vowel letters inherited from the Sanskrit tradition. Their forms are as follows:

Similar to wyanjana letters, modern Javanese language no longer uses the whole inventory of swara letters, only short vowel letters are now commonly used and taught. In modern orthography, swara letters may be used to replace wyanjana ha ꦲ (which may have caused ambiguous readings between /ha/ or /a/) to disambiguate the pronunciation of unfamiliar terms and names.

Pa cerek ꦉ, pa cerek dirgha ꦉꦴ, nga lelet ꦊ, and nga lelet raswadi ꦋ are syllabic consonants that are primarily used in specific Sanskrit cases. When adapted to languages outside of Sanskrit, the function and pronunciation of these letters tend to vary. In modern Javanese language, only pa cerek and nga lelet are used; pa cerek is pronounced /rə/ while nga lelet is pronounced /lə/. Both letters are usually re-categorized into their own class called aksara gantèn in modern tables. These letters are mandatory shorthand that replace every combination of ra pepet (ꦫꦼ → ꦉ) and la pepet (ꦭꦼ → ꦊ).

Rékan 
Aksara rékan (ꦲꦏ꧀ꦱꦫ ꦫꦺꦏꦤ꧀) are additional letters used to write foreign sounds. This type of letters were initially developed to write Arabic loanwords, later adapted to write Dutch loanwords, and in contemporary usage are also used to write Indonesian and English loanwords. Most rékan letters are formed by adding the cecak telu diacritic on the native letters that are considered closest-sounding to the foreign sound in question. For example, rékan letter fa ꦥ꦳ is formed by adding cecak telu over the wyanjana letter pa ꦥ. The combination of wyanjana letter and corresponding foreign sounds for each rékan may be different between sources. Some rékan letters are as follows:

Diacritics 
Diacritics (sandhangan ꦱꦤ꧀ꦝꦔꦤ꧀) are dependent signs that are used to modify the inherent vowel of a letter. Similar to Javanese letters, Javanese diacritics may be divided into several groups based on their function.

Swara 
Sandhangan swara (ꦱꦤ꧀ꦝꦁꦔꦤ꧀ꦱ꧀ꦮꦫ) are diacritics that are used to change the inherent /a/ into different vowels. Their forms are as follows:

Similar to swara letters, only short vowel diacritics are taught and used in contemporary Javanese, while long vowel diacritics are only used in Sanskrit and Kawi writing.

Panyigeging wanda 
Sandhangan panyigeging wanda (ꦱꦤ꧀ꦝꦁꦔꦤ꧀ꦥꦚꦶꦒꦼꦒꦶꦁ ꦮꦤ꧀ꦢ) are diacritics used to write closed syllables. Their forms are as follows:

Wyanjana 
Sandhangan wyanjana (ꦱꦤ꧀ꦝꦁꦔꦤ꧀ꦮꦾꦚ꧀ꦗꦤ) are diacritics that are used to write consonant cluster with semivowels that occur in a single syllable. Their forms are as follows:

Conjunct 
The inherent vowel of each basic letter can be suppressed with the use of the virama, natively known as pangkon. However, the pangkon is not normally used in the middle of a word or sentence. For closed syllables in such positions, a conjunct form called pasangan (ꦥꦱꦔꦤ꧀) is used instead. Every basic letter has a pasangan counterpart, and if a pasangan is attached to a basic letter, the inherent vowel of the attached letter is nullified. Their forms are as follows:

Examples of pasangan use, using characters from the Unicode Standard for Javanese script (which is used in this article), are as follows:

Note that the pasangan of a letter can be produced by typing the pangkon followed by the letter in its aksara/basic form. This appeals to the idea that a pangkon mutes the vowel of previous letter, and that adding a pasangan is phonetically equivalent to first muting the vowel of the previous letter and then adding a new letter.

Numerals 
The Javanese script has its own numerals (angka ꦲꦁꦏ) that behave similarly to Arabic numerals. However, most Javanese numerals has the exact same glyph as several basic letters, for example the numeral 1 ꧑ and wyanjana letter ga ꦒ, or the numeral 8 ꧘ and murda letter pa ꦦ. To avoid confusion, numerals that are used in the middle of sentences must be enclosed within pada pangkat or pada lingsa punctuations. For example, tanggal 17 Juni (the date 17 June) is written ꦠꦁꦒꦭ꧀꧇꧑꧗꧇ꦗꦸꦤꦶ or ꦠꦁꦒꦭ꧀꧈꧑꧗꧈ꦗꦸꦤꦶ. Enclosing punctuation may be ignored if their use as numerals is understood by context, for example as page numbers in the corner of pages. Their forms are as follows:

Punctuation 
Traditional Javanese texts are written with no spaces between words (scriptio continua) with several punctuation marks called pada (ꦥꦢ). Their form are as follows:

In contemporary teaching, the most frequently used punctuations are pada adeg-adeg, pada lingsa, and pada lungsi, which are used to open paragraphs (similar to pillcrow), separating sentences (similar to comma), and ending sentences (similar to full stop). Pada adeg and pada pisélèh may be used to indicate insertion in the middle of sentences similar to parenthesis or quotation marks, while pada pangkat has a similar function to the colon. Pada rangkap is sometimes used as an iteration mark for reduplicated words (for example kata-kata ꦏꦠꦏꦠ → kata2 ꦏꦠꧏ).

Several punctuation marks do not have Latin equivalents and are often decorative in nature with numerous variant shapes, for example the rerenggan which is sometimes used to enclose titles. In epistolary usage, several punctuations are used in the beginning of letters and may also be used to indicate the social status of the letter writer; from the lowest pada andhap, to middle pada madya, and the highest pada luhur. Pada guru is sometimes used as a neutral option without social connotation, while pada pancak is used to end a letter. However this is a generalized function. In practice, similar to rerenggan these epistolary punctuation marks are often decorative and optional with various shape used in different regions and by different scribes.

When errors occurred during manuscript copying, several Kraton scribes used special correction marks instead of crossing out the erroneous parts: tirta tumétès normally found in Yogyakarta manuscripts, and isèn-isèn found in Surakarta manuscripts. These correction marks are directly applied following the erroneous part before the scribe continued writing. For example, if a scribe wanted to write pada luhur ꦥꦢꦭꦸꦲꦸꦂ but accidentally wrote pada hu ꦥꦢꦲꦸ before realizing the mistake, this word may be corrected into pada hu···luhur ꦥꦢꦲꦸ꧞꧞꧞ꦭꦸꦲꦸꦂ or ꦥꦢꦲꦸ꧟꧟꧟ꦭꦸꦲꦸꦂ.

Pepadan 
Other than the regular punctuation, one of Javanese texts' distinctive characteristics is pepadan (ꦥꦼꦥꦢꦤ꧀), a series of highly ornate verse marks. Several of their form are as follows:

The series of punctuation marks that forms pepadan have numerous names in traditional texts. Behrend (1996) divides pepadan into two general groups: the minor pada which consist of a single mark, and the major pada which are composed of several marks. Minor pada are used to indicate divisions of poetic stanzas, which usually came up every 32 or 48 syllables depending on the poetic metre. Major pada are used to demarcate a change of canto (which includes a change of the metre, rhythm, and mood of the recitation) occurring every 5 to 10 pages, though this may vary considerably depending on the structure of the text. Javanese guides often list three kinds of major pada: purwa pada ꧅ ꦧ꧀ꦖ ꧅ which is used in the beginning of the first canto, madya pada ꧅ ꦟ꧀ꦢꦿ ꧅ which is used in between different cantos, and wasana pada ꧅ ꦆ ꧅ which is used in the end of the final canto. But due to the large variety of shapes between manuscripts, these three punctuations are essentially treated as a single punctuation in most Javanese manuscripts.

Pepadan is one of the most prominent elements in a typical Javanese manuscript and are almost always written with high artistic skills, including calligraphy, coloring, and even gilding. In luxurious royal manuscripts, the shape of the pepadan may even contain visual puns that gave clues to the readers regarding the canto of the text; a pepadan with wings or bird figure resembling a crow (called dhandhang in Javanese) indicates the dhandhanggula metre, while pepadan with elements of a goldfish indicates the maskumambang metre (literally "gold floating on water"). One of the scribal centers with the most elaborate and ornate pepadan is the scriptorium of Pakualaman in Yogyakarta.

Order
Modern Javanese script is commonly arranged in the Hanacaraka sequence, named in accordance to the first five letters in the sequence. In this sequence, the 20 consonant letters that are used in the modern Javanese language formed a perfect pangram that is often linked to the myth of Aji Saka. This sequence has been used by pre-independence Javanese people from at least the 15th century when the island of Java started to receive significant Islamic influence. There are numerous interpretations on the supposed philosophical and esoteric qualities of the hanacaraka sequence.

The hanacaraka sequence is not the only collation scheme that is used to arrange the Javanese script. For Sanskrit and Kawi orthography that requires 33 basic letters, the Javanese script can be arranged phonologically by its place of articulation in accordance to the Sanskrit principle established by Pāṇini. This sequence, sometimes called the Kaganga sequence based on its first four letters, is a standard sequence used by other Brahmi descendant scripts such as Devanagari, Tamil, Thai, and Khmer.

Sample texts
Below is an excerpt of  printed in 1871 with modern Javanese language and spelling.

Below is an excerpt of Kakawin Rāmāyaṇa printed in 1900 using Kawi language and spelling.

Comparison with Balinese
The closest relative to the Javanese script is the Balinese script. As direct descendants of the Kawi script, Javanese and Balinese still retain many similarities in terms of basic glyph shape for each letter. One noticeable difference between both scripts is in their orthography; Modern Balinese orthography is more conservative in nature than Modern Javanese counterpart.
 Modern Balinese orthography retains Sanskrit and Kawi conventions that are no longer used in modern Javanese. According to Balinese orthography, this may be deemed as coarse or incorrect because désa is a Sanskrit loanword (deśa) that should have been spelled according to its original spelling: déśa /, using sa murda instead of sa nglegéna. The Balinese language does not differentiate between the pronunciation of sa nglegéna and sa murda, but the original Sanskrit or Kawi spelling is retained whenever possible. One of the reason for this spelling practice is to differentiate homophones in writing, such as between the word pada (earth/ground), pāda (foot), and padha (same), as well as asta (is), astha (bone), and aṣṭa (eight).
 Modern Javanese orthography use aksara murda which are used for honorific purposes in writing respected names, while Modern Balinese orthography does not have a such rule.

Glyph comparison between the two scripts can be seen below:

Usage in another language

Sundanese Cacarakan
 is one of Sundanese language writing system, which means "similar to Carakan". It was officially used from 16 to 20 centuries. However, there are several places which use . There are several orthographic difference to modern Javanese orthography:
 Consonant [ɲ] <ny> is written as ꦤꦾ for free standing ngalagena, while ꧀ꦚ as diacritic pasangan. Carakan ꦚ is not used in Cacarakan.
Similar to Balinese wianjana, Cacarakan ngalagena or wianjana consists of 18 letters instead of 20 letters in Carakan nglegena or wianjana. The two letters are ꦝ <ḍa> and ꦛ <ṭa>. For more details in seeing these differences, below is shown a table of the Sundanese Cacarakan and Javanese Carakan Ngalagena or Consonant Letters.

From the table it can be seen that the letter /dha/ in Carakan (Javanese) is used to represent the sound "da" in Cacarakan (Sundanese). Whereas for produces the sound "nya", Cacarakan (Sundanese) uses a series of letters /a/ plus a pengkal (Carakan). Sundanese Cacarakan uses the same letter pairs as Carakan, with the same writing rules. It's just different at times giving sandhangan (Carakan) or rarangkén (Cacarakan) used modified rules to produce Sundanese vowel sounds.

In the Cacarakan swara/sora script the letter /i/ is written with a series of letters /a/ added with wulu (Carakan) or panghulu (Cacarakan). In the Javanese Carakan alphabet no special vowels are used for the sound /e/ (pepet), while in Cacarakan the letters /e/ pepet are written independently in a series the letter /a/ is added with pepet (Cacarakan) or pamepet (Cacarakan). Another vowel that appears is to describe the sound [ö] or the letter / eu / that quite dominant used in Sundanese. The letter /eu/ is written with a series of letters / a / added by tarung (Carakan) and pepet (Carakan) or simply called paneuleung in the term Sundanese Cacarakan.

Madurese Carakan
In Madurese language, Javanese script is called Carakan Madhurâ or Carakan Jhâbân (script derived from Javanese). If in Javanese language each character can represent the sound /a /or /ɔ /, then in Madurese language it represents the sound /a /or /ɤ /. The carakan Madhurâ form itself consists of aksara ghâjâng (aksara nglegena), aksara rajâ or murdâ (aksara murda),  aksara sowara or swara (aksara swara), and aksara rèka'an (aksara rékan). There is also pangangghuy (sandhangan) which consists of pangangguy aksara (sandhangan swara), pangangghuy panyèghek (sandhangan panyigeging wanda), and pangangghuy panambâ (sandhangan wyanjana).

Comparison with Javanese

Broadly speaking, there is no significant difference with the Javanese. However, in the Madurese language there is no difference in the use of aspirate and tanaspirate consonants.

Aksara rèka'an in Madurese language as taught in schools has only five characters, while in Madoereesche Spraakkunst and Sorat tjarakan Madurah there are seven and nine respectively:

Another difference is the use of wignyan which in Javanese functions as the -h suffix, while in Madurese it becomes the - as shown in the following table:

Unicode 

Javanese script was added to the Unicode Standard in October, 2009 with the release of version 5.2.

The Unicode block for Javanese is U+A980–U+A9DF. There are 91 code points for Javanese script: 53 letters, 19 punctuation marks, 10 numbers, and 9 vowels:

Gallery

See also 
 Javanese language
 Javanese literature
 Tuladha Jejeg

Notes

References

Bibliography

Orthographical guides 
  Also known as Wewaton Sriwedari and Paugeran Sriwedari.
 

Sanskrit and Kawi

Sundanese

External links

Digital collection 
 British Library manuscript collection
 National Library of Indonesia manuscript collection
 Yayasan Sastra Lestari manuscript collection
 Widyapustaka references collection

Digitized manuscripts 
 A debt written on a piece of lontar (1708) British Library collection no. Sloane MS 1403E
 Babad Mataram and Babad ing Sangkala (1738) koleksi British Library no. MSS Jav 36
 A Malay-Javanese-Maduran language word list from early 19th century, British Library collection no. MSS Malay A 3
 An assortment of documents from the Kraton of Yogyakarta (1786–1812) British Library collection no. Add Ms 12341
 Papakem Pawukon from Bupati Sepuh Demak of Bogor (1814) British Library collection no. Or 15932
 Wejangan Hamengkubuwana I (1812) British Library collection no. Add MS 12337
 Raffles Paper - vol III (1816) a collection of Letters received by Raffles from the rules of the Malay archipelago, British Library collection no. Add MS 45273
 Serat Jaya Lengkara Wulang (1803) British Library collection no. MSS Jav 24
 Serat Selarasa (1804) British Library collection no. MSS Jav 28
 Usana Bali  (1870) a Javanese copy of a Balinese lontar of the same title, National Library of Indonesia collection no. CS 152

 Dongèng-dongèng Pieuntengen (1867) a collection of Sundanese tales written in the Javanese script compiled by Muhammad Musa

Others 
 Unicode proposal for the Javanese script
 Unicode documentation for the behavior of KERET diacritic
 Unicode documentation for the behavior of CAKRA diacritic
 Unicode documentation for the behavior of PENGKAL diacritic
 Unicode documentation for the behavior of TOLONG diacritic
 British Library Asian-African Studies blog, Javanese topic
 Javanese script transliterator by Benny Lin
Hana - Javanese Script Transliterator by Dan
 Download Javanese fonts in Tuladha Jejeg, Aksara di Nusantara, or Google Noto

 
Brahmic scripts
Javanese language
Indonesian scripts
Scripts with ISO 15924 four-letter codes